The Akron Aeros minor league baseball franchise has employed 19 managers since its 1980 inception in Lynn, Massachusetts.  Four of the managers have guided the team to win the Eastern League championship.

Jack Lind led the team to win the Eastern League title in the 1984 and 1985 seasons as the Double-A affiliate of the Cincinnati Reds.

Jay Ward managed the team to its third consecutive Eastern League title in the 1986 season as the Double-A affiliate of the Cincinnati Reds.

In 2003, as the Double-A affiliate of the Cleveland Indians, Brad Komminsk, led the team to its fourth Eastern League championship.

In 2005, still the Double-A affiliate of the Cleveland Indians, Torey Lovullo became the fourth manager to lead the team to an Eastern League championship.

Table key

Managers

References
General

Specific

Managers